Behrouz Saffarian (born February 13, 1978) is an Iranian composer, arranger, and producer. Saffarian was named in the top ten in both the composer and arranger sections in the poll of the best Iranian pop music of 1991 by Taranehmah magazine. Saffarian activity dates back to 1997.

Biography 
Behrouz Saffarian was born on February 13, 1978. He is the fourth and last child in the family. He has two brothers and a sister. His parents worked at the post office. Behrouz started playing the instrument for the first time at the age of five and used the citadel of his brother, Behzad. His family did not allow him to play music as a child so as not to jeopardize his educational status. He was supposed to be sent a keyboard from Germany when he was 11 years old, but the customs officials of Mehrabad airport refused to deliver it to the Saffarian family. Guidance officials did not cooperate to clear this keyboard and Behrooz's dream instrument was returned to Germany. Finally, at the age of 13, he got a keyboard. He borrowed instruments from people with more advanced keyboards and made rhythms for them, and although he did not receive a salary, he was satisfied that he had access to new instruments. After middle school, he went to Bargh Conservatory, and after a few months, he achieved his dream and graduated from music conservatory.

Conductor 
Behrouz Saffarian, conductor of Fereydoun Foroughi, Mohammad Esfahani and Ali Lohrasbi have been in charge for some time. He has announced that he does not intend to go on stage at the moment as the conductor of the orchestra, and for the last time he officially appeared on the stage at our music festival and took the piece of Bagh-e-Raz alley to the stage.

Artistic collaboration with singers 
Among the singers that Behrouz Saffarian has collaborated as a composer or arranger are Qassem Afshar, Khashayar Etemadi, Shadmehr Aghili, Mohammad Esfahani, Ehsan Khajeh Amiri, Roozbeh Bemani, Fereydoon Esraei, Mehrzad Isfahanpour, Mohammad Khakpour, Ali Lohrasbi, Mohsen Chavoshi, Reza Sadeghi.

Awards 

 Barbad Award for Best Music Album of the Year - 2015

References 

Living people
1975 births
Iranian composers
21st-century Iranian musicians
Iranian music arrangers
Iranian record producers
Iranian pop musicians
Iranian pianists
Barbad award winners